Catastrophe Ballet is the second studio album by American rock band Christian Death. It was released in 1984, through record label Contempo.

Besides founder Rozz Williams, the lineup on the album is completely different from the band's debut, Only Theatre of Pain, and is the first record to feature future band leader Valor Kand. This and the follow up record Ashes would be the final releases to feature Williams before his departure in mid 1985.

Content 

Catastrophe Ballet, featured a change in Williams' vocal delivery. While Only Theatre of Pain and the Deathwish EP had Williams presenting a rhythmic spoken word style with an almost androgynous pitch to his voice, Catastrophe Ballet showed a richer, less harsh side to his vocal stylings, with more influence from David Bowie and Lou Reed. Rather than the occult-oriented lyrics from the first album, the singer showed a new-found interest in Surrealism and the Dada movement. Kand, Demone and Glass shared these interests, and the synergy between them helped cultivate the musical change from the old band's murky, dark punk to a more elegant, romantic strain of guitar-driven rock, though a tribalistic drumming was also added into the mix.

Album cover 

The popular front cover art of this album was by Serge Burner of the Invitation Au Suicide label staff.

Reception 

Trouser Press described the album as "a gem" and "goth that can afford to take itself seriously".

Track listing 
Arranged by Valor. All songs copyright QAH Music U.S.A.
"Awake at the Wall" (Music-Williams-Demone-Valor, Lyrics-Williams)
"Sleepwalk" (Music-Williams & Valor, Lyrics-Williams)
"The Drowning" (Music & Lyrics-Williams)
"The Blue Hour" (Music-Williams & Valor, Lyrics-Williams)
"As Evening Falls" (Music-Williams & Valor, Lyrics-Williams)
"Androgynous Noise Hand Permeates" (Music-Valor & Parkinson)
"Electra Descending" (Music-Williams & Valor, Lyrics-Williams)
"Cervix Couch" (Music-Williams-Demone-Valor, Lyrics- Williams)
"This Glass House" (Music-Williams & Valor, Lyrics-Williams)
"The Fleeing Somnambulist" (Music-Williams & Valor)

Re-releases 

The album was re-released in 1987 as A Catastrophe Ballet with Rhapsody of Youth and Rain with three bonus tracks:
"The Somnolent Pursuit" ("The Fleeing Somnabulist" backwards)
"Between Youth" (B-side track from Believers of the Unpure)
"After the Rain" (B-side track from Believers of the Unpure)

In 1999 it was released with live recordings of "Awake at the Wall" and "The Drowning" and a CD-Rom track with pictures.

In 2009, the album was re-released once more with an unreleased studio track entitled "Beneath His Widow" featuring Rozz Williams.

Personnel 

 Rozz Williams – vocals, producer
 Valor Kand – guitars, backing vocals
 Gitane Demone – keyboards, backing vocals
 Constance Smith – bass
 David Glass – drums

 Production
 Eric Westfall – producer, recording, engineering

References

External links 
"Catastrophe Ballet" at discogs

1984 albums
Christian Death albums
Season of Mist albums